Margret Wittmer (1904-2000) was one of the original settlers of Floreana Island. 

She was born in Cologne on 12 July 1904. Margret, her husband Heinz, and her stepson Harry moved to Floreana Island in 1932, following the arrival of German doctor Friedrich Ritter and his wife, Dore Strauch. Margret was in the fourth month of her first pregnancy, and she gave birth to a son and a daughter while living on the island.

She wrote about her experiences of being an early settler in the book Floreana: A Woman's Pilgrimage to the Galapagos. She returned to Germany in 1960 to present her book

Margret’s book attracted more German tourists to Floreana Island. She built several bungalows to host different tourists and scientists that visited Floreana.  

Actress Diane Kruger portrayed Wittmer in the documentary The Galapagos Affair.

Margret died in 2000. She was buried on Floreana Island.

References

German women writers
1904 births
2000 deaths
German emigrants to Ecuador